Michael Nielsen (born 3 August 1975 in Roskilde) is a Danish sport shooter. He won a silver medal in skeet shooting at the 2003 European Championships in Brno, Czech Republic, and eventually finished seventh at the 2004 Summer Olympics, competing for the Danish team. Nielsen trains under longtime coach Kjild Fristrup as a member of the shooting team at SK København.

Nielsen qualified for the Danish team in the men's skeet at the 2004 Summer Olympics in Athens. He had eclipsed a minimum qualifying score of 124 to strike a silver-medal finish and to grab one of the Olympic quota places available at the European Championships less than a year earlier. Clearly one of the top favorites vying for an Olympic medal, Nielsen nailed 122 targets out of a possible 125 to force a third-place tie with four other shooters in the qualifying round, but fell abruptly in a tight duel to neighboring Norway's Harald Jensen 2 to 1, who coveted the last seed for the six-man Olympic final, relegating him to seventh.

Nielsen is also married to pistol shooter and three-time Olympian Susanne Meyerhoff.

References

External links

1975 births
Living people
Danish male sport shooters
Olympic shooters of Denmark
Shooters at the 2004 Summer Olympics
People from Roskilde
Sportspeople from Region Zealand